Khalid A. Al-Falih (born 1960) is Minister of Investment of Saudi Arabia since 25 February 2020. He served as Minister of Energy of Saudi Arabia and chairman of Saudi Aramco. He also has previously served as the Saudi Arabian Health Minister and Aramco's CEO.

Early life and education
Al-Falih was born in 1960 in Dammam, Saudi Arabia, where he was also raised. He attended Texas A&M University, graduating in 1982 with a bachelor's degree in mechanical engineering, and later pursued an MBA at the King Fahd University of Petroleum and Minerals, which he completed in 1991.

Early years at Aramco: 1979–2008
Al-Falih joined Saudi Aramco (formerly, Aramco) in 1979. For over several years, he held positions of increasing responsibility and in 1992, he joined the Consulting Services Department (CSD). He supervised several technical units, mainly the Mechanical and Civil Systems Division and was named manager of CSD in January 1995. He was assigned as manager, Ras Tanura Refinery Maintenance Department in late 1995; and by 1998; manager, Business Analysis Department.

In July 1999, Al-Falih became president of Petron Corporation, a joint venture between Saudi Aramco and the Philippine National Oil Company. He returned to the Kingdom in September 2000 to serve as vice chairman on the Saudi Aramco Study Team for Upstream Gas Ventures, until his appointment as vice president of Gas Ventures Development and Coordination in May 2001. He played an instrumental role in the negotiations with the international oil companies (IOCs) & other major national oil companies (NOCs) in connection with the Kingdom's Natural Gas Initiative. Ultimately, four joint ventures, namely – South Rub' al-Khali Company (SRAK), Luksar Energy, Sino Saudi Gas & EniRepSa Gas were consummated between Saudi Aramco and various leading IOCs, Nocs and emerging oil companies.

In October 2004, Al-Falih was appointed to the board of directors of Saudi Aramco. He also served as chairman of the board of the South Rub' al-Khali joint venture between Shell, Total and Saudi Aramco.

CEO of Saudi Aramco: 2009–2015
In Nov 2008, Abdallah S. Jum'ah, then president and CEO of Saudi Aramco, retired and Khalid A. Al-Falih, who was serving as Aramco's executive vice president of operations, was appointed as the new president and CEO of the company, effective 1 January 2009.

As Saudi Aramco's CEO, Falih headed the Manifa project, an oil field located in a bay along the coast of the Persian Gulf. The project includes 27-man-made islands connected by 25 miles of causeways. Upon its launch, it produced 500,000 barrels of crude oil per day.

Minister of Energy, Industry and Mineral Resources: 2016–2019 
The global oil economy caused prices to fluctuate dramatically, from a peak of almost $108 in June 2014 to $26 per barrel in February 2016, the lowest point since 2003. In May 2016, Al-Falih was appointed Minister of Energy, Industry and Mineral Resources, replacing outgoing Ali al-Naimi. The national plan Vision 2030 announced in April 2016 is designed to reduce the Kingdom's dependence on oil revenue, a new direction which affected the makeup of Saudi ministries. In the royal decree announcing the appointment of Al-Falih, the former Petroleum Ministry was renamed "Ministry of Energy, Industry and Mineral Resources," incorporating also the Ministry of Electricity. Al-Falih also holds the position of chairman of the board of directors of Aramco, whose CEO is Amin H. Nasser.

The oil crash caused OPEC countries to react by diminishing production, the organization's first cut in eight years. Minister Al-Falih urged fellow OPEC member countries to stop exceeding their output targets, and met with Venezuelan and Kazakh counterparts in August 2017 in order to extend the deal of cutting production until March 2018, by at least three more months.

On 8 September 2019, through a royal decree issued by King Salman, Al-Falih was relieved of his duties as the energy minister. He was replaced by Prince Abdulaziz bin Salman, the king's elder son, in the post.

Minister of Investment: 2020–present 

On 25 February 2020, Al-Falih was appointed by a royal decree as Minister of Investment, a newly created ministry in Saudi Arabia.

Public life and board memberships
Al-Falih is active in many social programs. He has served as chairman of the Dammam City Municipal Council. His board memberships in other community-focused organizations include the Technical and Vocational Training Corporation, the Prince Sultan bin Abdulaziz Fund for Supporting Small Business Projects for Women, and the Eastern Province Society for the Handicapped.

Al-Falih is a founding member of King Abdullah University of Science and Technology and serves as a member of its board of trustees. He sits on the board of directors of the U.S.-Saudi Arabian Business Council and previously served as a member of the JP Morgan International Council.

Personal life
Al-Falih currently resides in Dhahran.
Al-Falih is married to Najah Al-Garawi

Achievements 
Khalid Al-Falih was listed on the Forbes Most Powerful People for 2016. Forbes' annual ranking of The World's Most Powerful People identifies one person out of every 100 million whose actions mean the most.

Khalid Al-Falih received the Distinguished Alumnus Award in 2013 from Texas A & M University. Established in 1962, the Distinguished Alumnus Award is the highest honor bestowed upon a former student of Texas A&M University. Since its inception, 225 individuals have been recognized for their significant contributions to their professions, Texas A&M University and their local communities.

Khalid Al-Falih received the Petroleum Executive of the Year Award 2016 from Energy Intelligence. The Petroleum Executive of the Year award is the international energy industry's most prestigious award given in recognition of outstanding leadership by an executive in the international energy industry.

Honors 
  Grand Cordon of the Order of the Rising Sun: 2018

References

External links

 Saudi Aramco
U.S.-Saudi Arabian Business Council

Khalid
Khalid
Khalid
Khalid
Khalid
Khalid
1960 births
Grand Cordons of the Order of the Rising Sun
King Fahd University of Petroleum and Minerals alumni
Living people
People from Dhahran
Petroleum and mineral resources ministers of Saudi Arabia
Saudi Aramco
Texas A&M University alumni